An honorary position is one given as an honor, with no duties attached, and without payment. Other uses include:

 Honorary Academy Award, by the Academy of Motion Picture Arts and Sciences, United States
 Honorary Aryan, a status in Nazi Germany
 Honorary authorship, listing of uninvolved people as co-authors of research papers
 Honorary César, awarded by the Académie des Arts et Techniques du Cinema, France
 Honorary consul, an unpaid part-time diplomatic consul
 Honorary Goya Award, by the Academia de las Artes y las Ciencias Cinematográficas de España, Spain
 Honorary Police, unpaid police force in Jersey
 Honorary Prelate, a title used in the Catholic Church
 Honorary society (disambiguation), whose members are elected for meritorious conduct
 honorary title, awarded as a mark of distinction
 Honorary citizenship, awarded to aliens who have rendered service to the state
 Honorary degree, academic degree awarded to someone not formally qualified to receive it
 Honorary title (academic), an academic title such as honorary professor conferred by a university or professional body
 Honorary trust, a trust with neither a charitable purpose, nor a private beneficiary
 Honorary whites, a term that was used by the apartheid regime of South Africa

See also
 Honor (disambiguation)
 Honorary title (disambiguation)
 Honorarium
 The Honourable